Integrated business planning (IBP) is a process for translating desired business outcomes into financial and operational resource requirements, with the overarching objective of maximizing profit and / or cash flow, while cutting down risk. The business outcomes, on which IBP processes focus, can be expressed in terms of the achievement of the following types of targets:

 Revenue & demand
 Service levels
 Inventory levels
 Profits & margins
 Cash flow

Integration elements 
Integrated Business Planning is defined in different ways. One challenge in developing a common definition of IBP is that there is no universally agreed way of describing different degrees and forms of integrated processes. Mature IBP processes enable organizations to bring together different elements of planning into a single process. This includes, but is not limited to, the following:

 Supply & demand
 Finance & operations
 Functions & business processes
 Strategy / Outcomes & business processes
 Financial and non-financial measures
 Cash flow, costs and revenues

The role of IBP is to balance these different objectives in a way that achieves the best overall result. One way of accomplishing this is with prescriptive analytics. These tools are often employed in these processes to mathematically optimize parts of a plan, a classic example of which is inventory investment. The most mature IBP processes try to mathematically optimize all aspects of a plan.

History 
The term integrated business planning is an outgrowth of sales and operations planning (S&OP) a term referring to processes that balance demand with manufacturing resources.

There has been a lot of focus on integrated business planning in the context of sales and operations planning. Gartner refers to a 5-stage S&OP maturity model, wherein IBP is referred to as the Phased 4 & 5. Integrated Business Planning however is broader than S&OP. It is an approach that combines Enterprise Performance Management (EPM) and S&OP to provide incremental capabilities that neither provides individually. In so doing, IBP platforms address long-standing challenges that financial and operational professionals have struggled to overcome. The result: opportunities for step change improvements to how manufacturers plan, manage and govern their business. Here, the focus is on strengthening the financial integration and reconciliation of plans, as well as increasing the responsiveness of the supply chain using ad-hoc reports and what-if scenario analyses. To better predict customer demand, machine-learning technology helps to identify correlation patterns and automate the detection of demand changes.

Components 
Integrated Business Planning requires the following capabilities to be enabled:

a) Enterprise Model
 Ability to create a demand chain model
 Ability to create a supply chain model
 Ability to create a finance chain model
b) Integrated Planning
 Ability to create a plan across multiple functions
 Ability to create predictive and collaborative plans

c) Enterprise Optimization
 Ability to create optimized plans across multiple constraints
 Ability to create financial integration across optimization

Applications 
IBP has been used to model and integrate the planning efforts in a number of applications, including:
 Product profitability
 Customer profitability
 Capital expenditures
 Manufacturing operations
 Supply chain
 Business processes (human and information-based)
 Business policy
 Market demand curves
 Competitive strategy
All of the above can be summarized as Enterprise Optimization use cases.

Criticism 
Some argue that IBP is not any different from S&OP. Patrick Bower has described IBP as a marketing hoax, ⁣ a name developed to create confusion and sell consulting and system services. The main proponents of IBP are consulting companies. In response to this criticism, it has been asserted that IBP is not a marketing hoax, ⁣ but an important part of Enterprise Performance Management (EPM) system.

Another criticism is that IBP is not academically defined and is supply chain biased in its definition. The lack of academic standard leaves room for interpretation to what IBP is, which is confusing practitioners. In a 2015 S&OP survey, ⁣ 32% of participants answered that there is no difference between S&OP and IBP, 20% "did not know", and 71% of participants answered that there is a need for more industry standards around S&OP.

It has been called out that IBP has a lack of governance and in need of an industry group to create a unified definition. Due to the lack of academic and industry standards, there has been an attempt to create an open source definition for IBP:

See also 
 Business process modeling
 Business reference model
 Business intelligence

References 

Organizational performance management
Business intelligence terms
Network management
Supply chain management
Strategic management